Wah Taj is a 2016 Indian Hindi drama film directed by Ajit Sinha, and produced by Pawan Sharma and Abhinav Verma under the banners of Pen Films Pvt. Ltd. and SpyderWave Films. It features Shreyas Talpade and Manjari Fadnis in the lead roles. The film was released worldwide on 23 September 2016. It was declared tax-free in Uttar Pradesh on 22 September 2016.

Cast
 Shreyas Talpade as Tukaram Raosaheb Marathe
 Manjari Fadnis as Sunanda, Tukaram's wife
 Hemant Pandey as Visarjan Yadav
 Rajesh Sharma
 Rajeev Verma
 Rakesh Shrivastav
 Prachee Pathak
 Yusuf Hussain as Minister
Sunil Shakya
Shailendra Jain
Govind Pandy

Plot
It's a sunny day in Agra. People are getting ready to head off to work while tourists are lining up at the Taj Mahal. But outside Taj Mahal, the atmosphere is different.

Tukaram Marathe, his wife Sundari and their daughter have laid claim to the land on which Taj Mahal stands. Tukaram says the land belonged to his ancestors and demands it back. His claim is relayed by the media and this puts the authorities in action. The jail minister Visarjan Yadav is sent to sort things out but he ends up making matters worse. Tukaram and Sundari refuse to back down and sit on a hunger strike on the Yamuna plains.

Repeated attempts from Yadav and the Chief Minister yield no results and the case goes to court. Here, Tukaram is asked to present proof of his claim. He presents letters from Emperors Humayun and Akbar addressed to his ancestors and after testing, it appears that the letters are authentic. Till the matter is in court, Tukaram asks for the Taj Mahal to be shut down for tourists.

After much deliberation, Tukaram and Sundari strike a deal with the government. They ask to be given land elsewhere in the country for farming. This demand is granted but the problem doesn't end there. The land they randomly select, belongs to a big industrialist who is not willing to let go off it. Unable to arm-twist the government, the industrialist hires a killer to finish Tukaram.

Production
Wah Taj was shot primarily in Agra and Bhopal with a short schedule in Mumbai. The shooting of the movie was wrapped up in June, 2013 & was earlier slated for a release towards late 2013.

Reception

Times of India provided it 2.5/5 rating and wrote, "Wah Taj aims to put focus on the pitiable conditions of farmers and the devil-may-care approach of the government machinery".

Soundtrack

The music was released on 7 September 2016 by Zee Music Company.

References

External links

2016 films
2010s Hindi-language films